Freight train may refer to:

A freight train, or goods train; the transportation used in Freight rail transport

Media and entertainment
Freight Train (book), children's book by Donald Crews
Freight Train (folk song), song by Elizabeth Cotten
Freight Train (album), a 2010 album by Alan Jackson
Freight Train (Nitro song), song by glam metal band Nitro
Freight Train Music, a company by Jimmy Barnes

Stage and character names
Freight Train, ring name for wrestler Jimmy Jacobs
Freight Train, character in TV series Big Time Rush, see List of Big Time Rush characters
Levar "Freight Train" Brown, minor character in TV series The Cleveland Show, see List of The Cleveland Show characters

Sports
nickname of David Peralta (born 1987), MLB player